Santiago Torres (born 1882, date of death unknown) was an Argentine fencer. He competed in the team sabre competition at the 1924 Summer Olympics making it to semifinals.

References

External links
 

1882 births
Year of death missing
Argentine male fencers
Argentine sabre fencers
Olympic fencers of Argentina
Fencers at the 1924 Summer Olympics